This is a list of people who were once indentured servants.

 George Abbitt
 Matthew Ashby
 Sally Brant
 William Buckland (architect)
 William Butten
 John Casor
 Judith Catchpole
 William Ewen
 Alexandre Exquemelin
 Mary Morrell Folger
 John Howland
 Elizabeth Hubbard (Salem witch trials)
 Anthony Johnson (colonist)
 William Moraley
 François l'Olonnais
 Milly Swan Price (1824–c.1880)
 Richard Frethorne
 John A. Treutlen
 Peter Williamson (memoirist)
 Harriet E. Wilson

References